Negueira de Muñiz is a town in the province of Lugo, Galicia, northern Spain.

References

External links 
Map
Negueira de Muñiz page at Diputación Provincial de Lugo

Municipalities in the Province of Lugo